Scarecrow Video is an independently owned, non-profit video sales and rental store. It is the last video rental store still operating in the Seattle city limits after the closures of the 32-year-old Video Isle store in January 2019 and Reckless Video in July 2021.

Collection

Scarecrow offers a wide selection of foreign DVDs, over 5,000 anime movies, and DVD players and other media devices for rental (including PAL, laser disc players and region free DVD players). 14,676 items are still on VHS. 263 items are on laserdisc.

As of 2019, Scarecrow's collection held more than 132,000 titles, about 4,100 of which were added in 2017. Many of them out of print (some require deposits that range from $150 – $1000).  Of the top 100 rarest titles (cross-checked against various institutions' lists), 88 of them are not held by the Library of Congress. The total number of "very rare" titles in which Scarecrow may have the only publicly accessible copy is 77 out of 100. There are 129 foreign country sections, featuring about 126 languages aside from English, available in store. The earliest original release date in their collection is from 1891.

In 2004, the store produced The Scarecrow Video Movie Guide, published by Sasquatch Books.

History

Located in the University District of Seattle, Washington, the store was opened in 1988 by Rebecca and George Latsios as well as John McCullough. From the beginning the store was known as a welcome, open place for film lovers to find rare titles and be greeted by Latsios's trademark "Hello, my friend." Celebrity patrons are rumored to include Quentin Tarantino, Bridget Fonda, Courtney Love, Winona Ryder, Directors John Woo and Bernardo Bertolucci, and legendary film critic Roger Ebert.

In 1995, Latsios was diagnosed with brain cancer and given six months to live.  He responded by spending, perhaps recklessly, in large numbers of rare and unique videos, cementing the store's reputation as a Seattle icon of unique and rare titles, while ignoring other responsibilities such as federal taxes.  For these reasons the store was sold in 1999.  Latsios returned to his native Greece and died in 2003.

Facing stiff competition from online streaming services, the store nearly went out of business in 2014. But rather than sell off Scarecrow’s collection of more than 100,000 titles to private collectors, owners Carl Tostevin & Mickey McDonough chose to donate the store in its entirety to a group formed by current and former store employees and long-time patrons. In October 2014, Scarecrow's catalog was donated to the Scarecrow Project, and Scarecrow Video reopened under new ownership as a non-profit. This allowed Scarecrow Video to preserve “one of the world's largest publicly available libraries of film and television”.

Today, Scarecrow Video continues to operate its video rental store business in its second Seattle location with the added mission of maintaining “full public access” to its extensive media collection. (Its original location was on Latona, in the Ravenna neighborhood). Scarecrow now offers free community film screenings in its private screening room, a weekly children’s story hour at its store, summer outdoor movie events at Magnuson Park and other community events, and Silver Screeners movie discussion groups at Seattle-area public libraries and senior centers.

See also
 Movie Madness Video in Portland, Oregon
 VisArt Video in Charlotte, North Carolina

References

External links
 

Culture of Seattle
University District, Seattle
Organizations established in 2014
Non-profit organizations based in the United States
501(c)(3) organizations
History of film
Video rental services